The Hmong Studies Journal is an irregularly published, peer-reviewed academic journal covering studies on the Hmong people. The journal was established in 1996 and the editor in chief and publisher is Mark Pfeifer. The journal is indexed by Academic Search Complete and ProQuest.

References

External links

 

Southeast Asian studies journals
Publications established in 1996
English-language journals
Hmong studies
Irregular journals